Márton Csányi was a Hungarian jurist and county official from the old noble Csányi family, who served as First Deputy Prosecutor from 7 April 1790 to 10 December 1793, and Crown Prosecutor of Zala County from 10 December 1793 to 17 September 1797.

Alongside his cousin, Ferenc III, he participated in the Zala branch of the Hungarian Jacobin movement, led by János Spissich. In that years, the Zala County Assembly was dominated by the Jacobins, which frequently adopted pro-French resolutions. As a result, alongside other officials, Csányi was dismissed from his office in September 1797 by Francis I, King of Hungary.

References

Sources

 
 

Hungarian jurists
18th-century Hungarian people
Marton